Dmitriy Sergeyevich Kramarenko (born 12 September 1974) is an Azerbaijani football coach and a former goalkeeper. He is a goalkeepers coach at CSKA Moscow.

International career
He made his debut for Azerbaijan national football team in 1992 at the age of 18, but then was not called up to the squad for an extended period. Kramarenko then switched to representing Russia and appeared in two friendlies for the Russia national under-21 football team in 1994 and 1995. He returned to Azerbaijan national team in 1998 and eventually collected 33 caps.

Personal life
His father is the former long-time goalkeeper for PFC Neftchi Baku, Sergey Kramarenko. Kramarenko also holds Russian citizenship. One of his twin daughters is Lala Kramarenko, a rhythmic gymnast competing for Russia.

Career statistics

National team statistics

References

External links
 
 
 

1974 births
Living people
Azerbaijani people of Russian descent
Azerbaijani footballers
Azerbaijani expatriate footballers
Soviet footballers
Azerbaijan international footballers
Russian footballers
Russia under-21 international footballers
People from Lankaran
FC Dynamo Moscow players
FC Torpedo Moscow players
FC Torpedo-2 players
FC Spartak Vladikavkaz players
PFC CSKA Moscow players
FC Baltika Kaliningrad players
FC Akhmat Grozny players
Khazar Lankaran FK players
Shamakhi FK players
Expatriate footballers in Russia
Russian Premier League players
Association football goalkeepers
Neftçi PFK players